Philip Orite Ipole (born 6 June 2001) is a Nigerian footballer who plays for Israeli club Hapoel Hadera.

Club career
He made his debut in the Russian Football National League for FC Olimp-Dolgoprudny on 17 July 2021 in a game against FC Rotor Volgograd.

Career statistics

Club

References

External links
 
 Profile by Russian Football National League

2001 births
People from Benue State
Living people
Nigerian footballers
Association football defenders
FC Zhetysu players
PFC Sochi players
FC Olimp-Dolgoprudny players
Hapoel Hadera F.C. players
Kazakhstan Premier League players
Russian First League players
Israeli Premier League players
Nigerian expatriate footballers
Expatriate footballers in Russia
Expatriate footballers in Kazakhstan
Expatriate footballers in Israel
Nigerian expatriate sportspeople in Russia
Nigerian expatriate sportspeople in Kazakhstan
Nigerian expatriate sportspeople in Israel